Uddevalla IS is a Swedish football club located in Uddevalla.

Historically, the club has also competed in athletics, bandy, cycling, gymnastics, orienteering, skating, skiing, and wrestling. The wrestler Sanfrid Söderqvist became European champion in 1929.

The original club colours were black and green striped shirts and blue shorts.

References

External links
 Uddevalla IS – Official site 

Football clubs in Västra Götaland County
Association football clubs established in 1907
Bandy clubs established in 1907
Defunct bandy clubs in Sweden